Johann Friedrich Rochlitz (12 February 1769 – 16 December 1842) was a German playwright, musicologist and art and music critic. His most notable work is his autobiographical account Tage der Gefahr (Days of Danger) about the Battle of Leipzig in 1813 — in Kunst und Altertum, Goethe called it "one of the most wondrous productions ever to have been written". A Friedrich-Rochlitz-Preis for art criticism is named after him — it is awarded by the Leipzig Gesellschaft für Kunst und Kritik and was presented for the fourth time in 2009.

Life 
Friedrich Rochlitz was born in Leipzig, where he attended the Thomasschule, and where, from 1789 to 1791, he studied theology, before working as a private tutor. In 1798 he founded the Allgemeine musikalische Zeitung, along with Gottfried Christoph Härtel, serving as its editor until 1818. He planned to marry the harpist Therese Emilie Henriette Winkel and so Duke Karl August made him a privy councillor of the Duchy of Saxe-Weimar on 14 September 1800, but the marriage did not materialise. Instead, on 23 February 1810 he married his childhood sweetheart Henriette Winkler née Hansen (1770–1834) on 23 February 1810. Her previous husband had been the Leipzig businessman Daniel Winkler and brought Winkler's precious art collection (including a Rembrandt painting) with her on her marriage to Rochlitz.

Rochlitz was a friend of several cultural figures of his era, including Johann Wolfgang von Goethe, Friedrich Schiller, E. T. A. Hoffmann and the composers Louis Spohr and Carl Maria von Weber — Weber dedicated his Piano Sonata No 4 in E minor (J287, Op 70) to Rochlitz. During a stay in Vienna, Rochlitz also got to know Beethoven and Franz Schubert, with the latter setting three poems by Rochlitz to music in 1827. Rochlitz died in Leipzig, aged 73.

Works 
 Charaktere interessanter Menschen, 4 volumes, Züllichau 1799-1803
 Kleine Romane und Erzählungen, 3 volumes, Frankfurt 1807
 Neue Erzählungen, 2 volumes, Leipzig 1816
 Für ruhige Stunden, 2 volumes, Leipzig 1828
 Für Freunde der Tonkunst, 4 volumes, Leipzig 1824–1832; 3rd edition 1868 [a collection of music essays]
 Auswahl des Besten aus Rochlitz' sämtlichen Werken, 6 Bände, Züllichau 1821-1822 [a collection of music essays]

References 
 Goethes Briefwechsel mit Friedrich Rochlitz, edited by W. v. Biedermann, Leipzig 1887.
Woldemar von Biedermann: Rochlitz, Johann Friedrich. In: Allgemeine Deutsche Biographie (ADB). Volume 30, Duncker & Humblot, Leipzig 1890, S. 85–91.

External links 
  Johann Friedrich Rochlitz on German Wikisource
  Archivdatenbank des Goethe- und Schiller-Archivs
  Works on and by Johann Friedrich Rochlitz in the Deutschen Nationalbibliothek catalogue
 

1769 births
1842 deaths
German writers about music
German autobiographers
German military historians
Writers from Leipzig
German male dramatists and playwrights
18th-century German dramatists and playwrights
19th-century German dramatists and playwrights
19th-century German male writers
German male non-fiction writers
18th-century German male writers